Bastida Pancarana is a comune (municipality) in the Province of Pavia in the Italian region Lombardy, located about 45 km south of Milan and about 14 km southwest of Pavia in the Oltrepò Pavese traditional region.

Bastida Pancarana borders the following municipalities: Bressana Bottarone, Castelletto di Branduzzo, Cava Manara, Mezzana Rabattone, Pancarana, Sommo, Zinasco.

Demographic evolution

References

Cities and towns in Lombardy